Metagonimus is a genus of trematodes, or fluke worms, in the family Heterophyidae.

It is a parasite causing metagonimiasis.

Species
There are 8 species within the genus Metagonimus include:
 Metagonimus hakubaensis Shimazu, 1999
 Metagonimus katsuradai Izumi, 1935
 Metagonimus minutus
 Metagonimus miyatai Saito, Chai, Kim, Lee and Rim, 1997
 Metagonimus otsurui Saito & Hori, 1962
 Metagonimus ovatus
 Metagonimus takahashii Takahashi, 1929
 Metagonimus yokogawai (Katsurada, 1912)

References

External links

 

Heterophyidae
Trematode genera